{{Infobox eruption
 | name = 1996 eruption of Gjálp
 | image = Skeidara.jpg
 | caption = Gjálp eruption: Jökulhlaup 1996 over Skeiðarársandur, the piedmont glacier Skeiðarárjökull and Öræfajökull in the background
 | start_date = 30 September 1996
 | end_date = 13 October 1996
 | volcano = Gjálp
 | type = Subglacial fissure eruption
 | location = Western Vatnajökull
 | coordinates = <ref>A. Jarosch et al.: Progressive cooling of the hyaloclastite ridge at Gjálp, Iceland, 1996–2005. Journal of Volcanology and Geothermal Research** 170 (2008) 218–229</ref>
 | VEI = 3
 | map_caption = Location of main volcano Grímsvötn within Vatnajökull
 | impact = Jökulhlaup over Skeiðarársandur, Hringvegur partially destroyed
}}

Gjálp is a hyaloclastite ridge (tindar) in Iceland under the Vatnajökull glacier shield. It originated in an eruption series in 1996 and is probably part of the Grímsvötn volcanic system,See also GVP:  Grimsvotn. Eruptive history. Retrieved 29 August 2020. though not all the scientists involved are of this opinion.

Importance
The eruption was of imminent importance, because it was for the first time that a subglacial eruption under a thick ice cover as well as the connected jökulhlaup could be observed and analyzed by modern techniques.See also: Hugh Tuffen, D.W. McGarvie, etal.: Will subglacial rhyolite eruptions be explosive or intrusive? Some insights from analytical models. Annals of Glaciology, in press. Lancaster University. (2006) Retrieved 30 August 2020.

Geography
Eruption location
The subglacial eruption fissure is to be found in the northwest corner of Vatnajökull ice cap more or less half way between the central volcanoes Bárðarbunga and Grímsvötn.

Vatnajökull ice cap
The Vatnajökull glacier which covered the location at time of eruption had a thickness of 500–600 m. In other places the 
glacier shield can have thicknesses of up to 900 m. Vatnajökull covered an area of 8.200 km2 in 1996, but it is retreating and measured just 8.100 km2 in 2007. The glacier is temperate, lies in lower elevations and is therefore sensible to climatic changes. As a consequence it has been advancing and retreating since the Weichselian glaciation. Its last advance took place during the so called Little Ice Age from the 13th to the end of the 19th century and since then it is retreating.

Parts of two volcanic zones of Iceland are placed under Vatnajökull, ie. the very active East Volcanic Zone (connected to rifting at the divergent plate boundary in Iceland), responsible for the highest number of eruptions after deglaciation  and with the mantle plume probably under Bárðarbunga, ie. under Vatnajökull. "More than 80 eruptions occurred during the last 800 years in Vatnajökull." There is also the much less active Öraefi Volcanic Belt, a flank zone mostly under the eastern part of Vatnajökull.See also: Helgi Björnsson, Páll Einarsson: Volcanoes beneath Vatnajökull, Iceland. Evidence from radio echo sounding, earthquakes and jökulhlaups. Jökull no. 40, 1990 Retrieved 8 August 2020. It is thought that due to climate change, Vatnajökull has lost about 10% of its mass since the end of the 19th century. Measurements showed an accentuated and even accelerating rate of glacio-isostatic uplift. This could lead to increased magma production (so called decompression melt production), because the "pot lid" formed by the glaciers and their weight will be absent in the future, and eruption frequency could increase as a consequence.

The region of the Gjálp fissures is part of this active East Volcanic Zone under Vatnajökull.

Geology

The Gjálp eruption formed in about two weeks a subglacial hyaloclastite ridge, also called tindar'' by some geologists, in a zone of known former eruptions.

The eruption in 1996

Precursors and possible connection between volcanic systems
Some heavy earthquakes (M5+) had taken place in the central volcano Bárðarbunga before and proved to be precursors of the eruptive events. New seismological studies (2019) see a parallel to the 2014–2015 eruptions and to the caldera drop in Bárðarbunga central volcano and postulate a similar magma migration to the eruption site though on a smaller scale. This could mean that the volcano is part of the fissure system of Bárðarbunga, not Grímsvötn.

Another possibility is that Bárðarbunga magma entered in a smaller portion the magmatic system of Grímsvötn and started the eruption by this intrusion. Bárðarbunga is known for such tendencies, her magma mingled with Torfajökull magma at least three times in the past which resulted in bimodal eruptions, eg. of the Veiðivötn and at Landmannalaugar by the end of the 15th century.

Formation of the tindar volcano
The Gjálp eruption took place at a some kilometers long known fissure under 550–700 m of glacier ice within Vatnajökull. The eruption in October 1996 could push through this ice in about 30 hours and took place from 30 September to 13 October 1996. The eruption fissure had a length of 6–7 km.

The location is some kilometers to the north of Grímsvötn caldera.

In the beginning, a 2–4 km long N–S trending depression was formed above the fissure, with time three ice cauldrons were built at each end and in the middle, but the eruption concentrated later on one of them where a 200–300 m wide crater came to light.  After some time, an open ice canyon was built above the fissure. It had a length of about 3,5 km and was up to 500 m in width.

The meltwater drained first through the ice canyon and then disappeared into subglacial channels and run from there to the subglacial caldera lake of Grímsvötn. The subglacial channels were easily recognized, because continuous melting caused by the hot water from the eruption site initiated the formation of depressions on the ice surface. And so the scientists followed the melting path down to Grímsvötn caldera.

Though the eruption was mostly explosive, the ash was not expelled far from the vents, but fell back into the canyon. The quantity of eruption products stayed more or less the same the whole time which was explained by ice flow into the crater.

During the two weeks of eruption, volcanic activity thawed no less than 3 km3 of ice, and this continued to a lesser extent for some time after the end of the eruption.

The newly formed tindar disappeared again completely under the glacier ice about 1 year later.

Eruption products
The eruptive products consisted of basaltic andesite which surprised the scientists as these more evolved rocks are neither typical for Bárðarbunga nor for Grímsvötn, both more connected to basaltic volcanism. Some scientists thought that Gjálp could be an independent volcano.

Jökulhlaup in 1996

In the beginning, scientists presumed that the eruption would be followed immediately by a big jökulhlaup (sort of a meltwater tsunami including large blocks of ice and a high quantity of sediment). But it took some time to fill the subglacial lake of Grímsvötn in such a manner that the ice wall holding it back would break.

Not before some weeks had passed after the eruption was terminated, the expected jökulhlaup took place from 4 to 7 November 1996. The meltwater streamed mostly in subglacial channels and in the end under the outlet glacier Skeiðarárjökull. There, to everybody's surprise, the water masses streamed in such a quantity that the whole glacier was lifted up.

In the end, the water sprang up from under the glacier edge and the flood covered most of Skeiðarársandur glacial outwash plain destroying on its way big parts of the main road Hringvegur including two bridges and some communication installations. Luckily, the road had been closed before so that nobody was injured.

The volume of meltwater produced by this eruption was around 4 km3. Over the sandur streamed up to 50–60.000 m3/sec. The first estimates had been somewhat lower.

Former eruption in 1938
At more or less the same place another eruption had taken place in the 1930s. It had also caused a jökulhlaup, but at the time, science could not yet analyze the events.

This eruption stayed subglacial.

See also

 Subglacial volcano
 Grímsvötn
 Subglacial eruption
 Bárðarbunga
 Ice cauldron

Further reading
 Helgi Björnsson: Subglacial lakes and jökulhlaups in Iceland. Global and Planetary Change 35 (2002) 255–271

References

1996 in Iceland
Bárðarbunga
East Volcanic Zone of Iceland
Grímsvötn
Subglacial eruptions
Subglacial volcanoes of Iceland
VEI-3 eruptions
Volcanic eruptions in Iceland